Only a Waiter (Swedish: Bara en kypare) is a 1959 Swedish comedy film directed by Alf Kjellin and starring Nils Poppe, Marianne Bengtsson and Git Gay. It was the last in a series of seven films featuring Poppe in the role of Fabian Bom. It was shot at the Råsunda Studios in Stockholm. The film's sets were designed by the art director P.A. Lundgren. It was the final screen appearance of the comedy actress Emy Hagman.

Synopsis
A waiter leads a secret double life as a stage entertainer and dreams of a big career ahead of him. He ignores his colleague Annie, who due to a recent inheritance wants him to help her run a new hotel. His head is turned when the world-famous performer Matilda comes to town, and he follows her to Stockholm.

Cast
 Nils Poppe as 	Fabian Bom
 Marianne Bengtsson as 	Annie
 Git Gay as 	Matilda Roos
 Karl-Arne Holmsten as 	Birger
 Adolf Jahr as 	Restaurangägare
 Emy Hagman as Selma
 Sigge Fürst as Manager
 Curt Masreliez as Gösta Susenberg
 Sven-Eric Gamble as 	Byggnadsarbetare
 Ragnar Klange as 	Krögare
 Carl-Gunnar Wingård as	Restauranggäst
 Hanny Schedin as 	Aina 
 Georg Skarstedt as 	Öldrickare 
 Carl Reinholdz as Man med överrock 
 Wilma Malmlöf as 	Portvakten 
 Gunnar 'Knas' Lindkvist as Kypare i restaurangvagnen

References

Bibliography 
 Qvist, Per Olov & von Bagh, Peter. Guide to the Cinema of Sweden and Finland. Greenwood Publishing Group, 2000.

External links 
 

1959 films
Swedish comedy films
1959 comedy films
1950s Swedish-language films
Films directed by Alf Kjellin
Swedish black-and-white films
Films set in Stockholm
1950s Swedish films